Wang Xiaoxue is a Chinese professional association football player who plays as a defender for Jiangsu in the Chinese Women's Super League.

References

1994 births
Living people
Chinese women's footballers
China women's international footballers
Footballers at the 2020 Summer Olympics
Olympic footballers of China
Women's association football defenders